AJ Jago is a Djiboutian football club located in the town of Jago. It currently plays in the top domestic Djibouti Premier League.

References

External links
Soccerway – Club Profile

Football clubs in Djibouti